The 1998–99 NBA season was the Hawks' 50th season in the National Basketball Association, and 31st season in Atlanta. On March 23, 1998, the owners of all 29 NBA teams voted 27–2 to reopen the league's collective bargaining agreement, seeking changes to the league's salary cap system, and a ceiling on individual player salaries. The National Basketball Players Association (NBPA) opposed to the owners' plan, and wanted raises for players who earned the league's minimum salary. After both sides failed to reach an agreement, the owners called for a lockout, which began on July 1, 1998, putting a hold on all team trades, free agent signings and training camp workouts, and cancelling many NBA regular season and preseason games. Due to the lockout, the NBA All-Star Game, which was scheduled to be played in Philadelphia on February 14, 1999, was also cancelled. However, on January 6, 1999, NBA commissioner David Stern, and NBPA director Billy Hunter finally reached an agreement to end the lockout. The deal was approved by both the players and owners, and was signed on January 20, ending the lockout after 204 days. The regular season began on February 5, and was cut short to just 50 games instead of the regular 82-game schedule.

The Hawks continued to split their home games between the Georgia Dome, and the Alexander Memorial Coliseum for the second consecutive season. In the off-season, the team signed free agents LaPhonso Ellis, second-year guard Anthony Johnson and re-signed former Hawks forward Grant Long. Ellis would reunite with his former teammate of the Denver Nuggets, 3-time Defensive Player of the Year Dikembe Mutombo. However, Ellis would be out for the remainder of the season with a hernia injury after just 20 games, being replaced by second-year forward Chris Crawford as the team's starting small forward. The Hawks played around .500 with a 9–9 start, then later on posted a 7-game winning streak in April, and won nine of their final eleven games. The team finished second in the Central Division with a 31–19 record.

Steve Smith led the team in scoring with 18.7 points per game, while Mookie Blaylock averaged 13.3 points, 5.8 assists and 2.1 steals per game, and Mutombo provided the team with 10.8 points, 12.2 rebounds and 2.9 blocks per game. In addition, Alan Henderson provided with 12.5 points and 6.6 rebounds per game, while Ellis contributed 10.2 points and 5.5 rebounds, and Long played a sixth man role, averaging 9.8 points and 5.9 rebounds per game off the bench. Corbin contributed 7.5 points per game also off the bench, and Crawford provided with 6.9 points per game. Mutombo and Blaylock were both named to the NBA All-Defensive Second Team, and Mutombo also finished in second place in Defensive Player of the Year voting.

In the Eastern Conference First Round of the playoffs, the Hawks faced off against the Detroit Pistons. Despite losing Henderson to an eye injury in Game 1, and losing Crawford to a shoulder injury in Game 2, the Hawks defeated the Pistons in five games, but would be swept by the 8th-seeded New York Knicks in four straight games in the Eastern Conference Semi-finals. The Knicks would become the first #8 seed to reach the NBA Finals, but would lose in five games to the San Antonio Spurs. This season would also be the last time the Hawks appear in the playoffs until 2008.

Following the season, Smith and second-year guard Ed Gray were both traded to the Portland Trail Blazers, while Blaylock was traded to the Golden State Warriors after seven seasons in Atlanta, Long signed as a free agent with the Vancouver Grizzlies, and Tyrone Corbin re-signed with the Sacramento Kings.

Offseason

Draft picks

Roster

Regular season

Season standings

z - clinched division title
y - clinched division title
x - clinched playoff spot

Record vs. opponents

Game log

|- align="center" bgcolor="ffbbbb"
|-
|| || || || || ||
|-

|- align="center" bgcolor="ffbbbb"
|-
|| || || || || ||
|-

|- align="center" bgcolor="ffbbbb"
|-
|| || || || || ||
|-

|- align="center" bgcolor="ffbbbb"
|-
|| || || || || ||
|-

Playoffs

|- align="center" bgcolor="#ccffcc"
| 1
| May 8
| Detroit
| W 90–70
| Steve Smith (19)
| Dikembe Mutombo (19)
| Mookie Blaylock (7)
| Georgia Dome20,884
| 1–0
|- align="center" bgcolor="#ccffcc"
| 2
| May 10
| Detroit
| W 89–69
| Dikembe Mutombo (28)
| Dikembe Mutombo (13)
| Mookie Blaylock (6)
| Georgia Dome16,377
| 2–0
|- align="center" bgcolor="#ffcccc"
| 3
| May 12
| @ Detroit
| L 63–79
| Tyrone Corbin (16)
| Dikembe Mutombo (10)
| Mookie Blaylock (5)
| The Palace of Auburn Hills14,812
| 2–1
|- align="center" bgcolor="#ffcccc"
| 4
| May 14
| @ Detroit
| L 82–103
| Steve Smith (21)
| Dikembe Mutombo (8)
| Corbin, Johnson (4)
| The Palace of Auburn Hills16,216
| 2–2
|- align="center" bgcolor="#ccffcc"
| 5
| May 16
| Detroit
| W 87–75
| Grant Long (26)
| Dikembe Mutombo (18)
| Blaylock, Smith (6)
| Alexander Memorial Coliseum8,460
| 3–2
|-

|- align="center" bgcolor="#ffcccc"
| 1
| May 18
| New York
| L 92–100
| Chris Crawford (26)
| Dikembe Mutombo (13)
| Mookie Blaylock (4)
| Georgia Dome18,513
| 0–1
|- align="center" bgcolor="#ffcccc"
| 2
| May 20
| New York
| L 70–77
| Mookie Blaylock (17)
| Dikembe Mutombo (17)
| Steve Smith (2)
| Georgia Dome22,558
| 0–2
|- align="center" bgcolor="#ffcccc"
| 3
| May 23
| @ New York
| L 78–90
| Long, Smith (17)
| Dikembe Mutombo (16)
| Mookie Blaylock (3)
| Madison Square Garden19,763
| 0–3
|- align="center" bgcolor="#ffcccc"
| 4
| May 24
| @ New York
| L 66–79
| Steve Smith (14)
| Long, Mutombo (11)
| three players tied (3)
| Madison Square Garden19,763
| 0–4
|-

Player statistics

Season

Playoffs

Awards and records
Mookie Blaylock, NBA All-Defensive Second Team
Dikembe Mutombo, NBA All-Defensive Second Team

Transactions

Trades
June 24, 1998
Traded Cory Carr, a 1999 second round draft pick and a 2000 second round draft pick to the Chicago Bulls for Shammond Williams.

January 22, 1999
Traded Christian Laettner to the Detroit Pistons for Scot Pollard and a 1999 first round draft pick.

Free agents
January 21, 1999
Signed Jeff Sheppard as a free agent.
Signed Anthony Johnson as a free agent.
Signed Mark West as a free agent.

January 30, 1999
Signed LaPhonso Ellis as a free agent.

February 1, 1999
Signed Grant Long as a free agent.

February 16, 1999
Waived Jeff Sheppard.

February 19, 1999
Waived Scot Pollard.
Waived Shammond Williams.

February 22, 1999
Signed Jeff Sheppard as a free agent.

March 4, 1999
Waived Jeff Sheppard.

March 19, 1999
Signed Jeff Sheppard to the first of two 10-day contracts.

April 8, 1999
Signed Jeff Sheppard to a contract for the rest of the season.

Player Transactions Citation:

See also
1998-99 NBA season

References

Atlanta Hawks seasons
Atlanta Haw
Atlanta Haw
Atlanta Hawks